Tennis was contested at the 2011 Summer Universiade from August 14 to August 21 at the Longgang Tennis Center and the Shenzhen Tennis Center in Shenzhen, China. Men's and women's singles, men's and women's team, and men's, women's, and mixed doubles events were contested.

Medal summary

Medal table

Medal events

See also
 Tennis at the Summer Universiade

References

 
2011 Summer Universiade events
2011